The Beechcraft 1900 is a twin-engine turboprop regional airliner manufactured by Beechcraft. It is also used as a freight aircraft and corporate transport, and by several governmental and military organizations. With customers favoring larger regional jets, Raytheon ended production in October 2002.

Developed from the Beechcraft Super King Air, the aircraft was designed to carry passengers in all weather conditions from airports with relatively short runways. In terms of the number of aircraft built and its continued use by many passenger airlines and other users, it is one of the most popular 19-passenger airliners in history.

Development

The 1900 is Beechcraft's third regional airliner after the Beechcraft Model 18 and Beechcraft Model 99 Airliner.

The Beechcraft 1900's design lineage began in 1949 with the Beechcraft Model 50 Twin Bonanza, a 5-passenger, reciprocating engine utility aircraft designed for the U.S. Army. A larger passenger cabin was added to the Twin Bonanza's airframe, and called the Model 65 Queen Air. This aircraft was, in turn, further modified by adding turboprop engines and cabin pressurization, and named the Model 90 King Air. A stretched version of the King Air was later developed and designated the Model 200 Super King Air. Beechcraft developed the 1900 directly from the Super King Air, in order to provide a pressurized commuterliner to compete with the Swearingen Metro and the British Aerospace Jetstream.

The 1900 first flew on September 3, 1982, with Federal Aviation Administration (FAA) certification awarded on November 22, 1983, under Special Federal Aviation Regulation (SFAR) 41C airworthiness standards. Like the 1900, the 1900C was certified under SFAR 41C, but the later 1900D version was certified to FAR Part 23 "Commuter Category" standards.

The 1900 entered service in February 1984, with the first ExecLiner corporate version delivered in 1985. A total of 695 Beechcraft 1900 aircraft were built, making the airliner the best-selling 19-passenger airliner in history. In 1991, the price of a 1900D Airliner was $3.95 million. With market trends favoring larger 50- to 90-seat regional jets, Raytheon ended production of the Beechcraft 1900 in October 2002. Many airlines continue to fly the 1900.

Design

Since the 1900 is derived from the King Air, all 1900s share certain characteristics with that aircraft. Cockpit controls and operations are similar to those of the King Air. While Federal Aviation Regulations require two pilots for passenger airline operations, the 1900 is designed and certificated for single-pilot operation in corporate or cargo settings, as is the King Air.

The 1900 is powered by two Pratt & Whitney Canada PT6A turboprop engines.
The propellers are manufactured by Hartzell, with four blades on each propeller. The blades are made from composite materials.

Performance

It can operate on grass and rough runways.

It is designed to operate in most weather conditions, including icing conditions, and it is usually equipped with weather radar to help pilots avoid severe weather. The aircraft can be fitted with a lavatory, using space otherwise available for passenger seating and cargo storage.

Variants

1900
The original design is known simply as the Beechcraft 1900. It features two airstair passenger boarding doors: one near the tail of the aircraft much like the smaller King Airs, and a second at the front just behind the cockpit. It has a small cargo door near the tail for access to the baggage compartment, which is behind the passenger compartment. Only three airframes were built, with "UA" serial numbers of UA-1, UA-2, and UA-3. UA-1 and UA-2 are stored at a Beechcraft facility in Wichita, Kansas. UA-3, registered FAB-043, served in Bolivia until it crashed in November 2011.

1900C

It quickly became clear that having two airstair doors on an aircraft holding only 19 passengers was excessive. In creating the 1900C, Beechcraft kept the front airstair, but eliminated the aft airstair door, installing an enlarged cargo door in its place. Other than the redesigned door layout, the early 1900Cs were substantially similar to the original 1900s. These were assigned serial numbers starting with the letters UB. A total of 74 UB version were built, many of which remain in service.
Aircraft in the UA and UB series employ a bladder-type fuel tank system in the wings. Later 1900Cs use a wet wing fuel system: entire sections of the wing are sealed off for use as fuel tanks. This design change allowed more fuel to be stored, substantially increasing the 1900C's range. The wet wing 1900Cs were assigned serial numbers beginning with "UC." These aircraft are also referred to as 1900C-1s. The wet wings proved popular, and the UC is the most common version of the low-ceiling 1900, with 174 UC airframes built.

Raytheon manufactured six 1900C aircraft for use by the U.S. military. These were assigned "UD" serial numbers, UD-1 through UD-6.

1900D

While the 1900C had become a popular regional airliner, Beechcraft undertook a substantial redesign of the aircraft, and in 1991 introduced a new version called the 1900D.

The 1900 and 1900C, like most 19-passenger airliners and small business jets, have fairly small passenger cabins, with ceilings so low that passengers (of typical male heights) cannot walk through the interior without bending forward. The 1900D was designed to remedy this by providing a "stand-up cabin", which would allow most passengers to walk upright. It is one of only two 19-seat airliners with this feature, the other being the British Aerospace Jetstream 31/32.

Because the taller passenger cabin adds both weight and drag to the airplane, other elements of the 1900D were also changed. More powerful engines and modified propellers were installed, winglets were added to reduce drag and increase the wings' efficiency, and the tail was made larger in response to the more powerful engines. The cockpit was updated with an Electronic Flight Instrument System (EFIS). The 1900D was certified under the then-new FAR Part 23 "Commuter Category" standards, which had replaced the earlier SFAR 41C. Since the UD serial numbers were already in use by the military 1900s, the 1900D airplanes have serial numbers beginning with UE. The 1900D is the most popular version of the airliner, with 439 of the 1900D built.

Super Freighter 
A supplemental type certificate has been awarded to Alpine Air Express to convert 1900D into cargo aircraft. The STC involved adding a second emergency exit to the cockpit and converting the interior to a cargo configuration. The 1900D can carry 900 cubic feet of cargo, 30% more than a 1900C. Powered by PT6-67D, the super freighter has a max takeoff weight of 17,120 lbs and is certified under the commuter category. Due to its standup cabin, the 1900D has a large internal volume. The large volume lends the aircraft well to the cargo industry where many packages are bulky and low in density. The 1900D is able to carry nearly as much volume as an EMB-120 and is certified for single pilot cargo operations. The single pilot crew and surplus of airframes allows for reduced operator costs.

Military C-12J
The U.S. military designation for the Beechcraft 1900C is C-12J. This is a variant of the C-12 Huron, which is the most common designation for military King Airs. The C-12J includes the six Beechcraft 1900s with 'UD' serial number prefixes built for the U.S. military, as well as other 1900Cs in U.S. military service.

Examples of C-12J aircraft in military service include one used for GPS jamming tests at the 586th Flight Test Squadron, Holloman Air Force Base, New Mexico, and three based at the 459th Airlift Squadron, Yokota Air Base, Japan. The U.S. Army operates both C-12J and 1900D aircraft along with other C-12 (King Air) aircraft.

King Air ExecLiner
The King Air ExecLiner was a marketing name for a corporate version of the Beechcraft 1900C.

Operators

Civilian operators
In July 2018, a total of 114 1900Cs and 192 1900Ds were in airline service: 207 in the Americas,  in Africa,  in Europe and 11 in the Asia Pacific and Middle East. Airline operators with nine or more aircraft were:

 Trans Guyana Airways

Military operators

Accidents and incidents
 November 23, 1987: a Ryan Air Services 1900 crashed on approach to the airport at Homer, Alaska. Flight 103 was fully loaded (all 19 seats occupied; 1437 pounds of cargo) when it took off from Kodiak. The aircraft lifted off the runway, fell back and accelerated for about another 15 knots before it became airborne. The aircraft was approaching Homer when it was cleared for the localizer/DME approach to runway 3. The crew reported a  final five minutes later. On short final the wings were seen to rock back and forth; the aircraft then dropped steeply to the ground in a rather flat attitude, struck the airport perimeter fence and slid to a stop on its belly. Both pilots and sixteen of the nineteen passengers were killed. The investigation into the crash (the first crash of a 1900) stated the probable cause as "the failure of the flight crew to properly supervise the loading of the airplane which resulted in the center of gravity being displaced to such an aft location that the airplane control was lost when the flaps were lowered for landing."
 May 18, 1990: a 1900C, operating for Aerolift Philippines as Flight 075 to Surigao, took off from runway 13 at Manila's international airport. During takeoff the no. 2 engine failed. The airplane began turning to the right as the crew radioed that they were returning to the airport. With the undercarriage down and the flaps still in takeoff position the airplane impacted a house in the suburban Paranaque neighborhood. All 21 on board the aircraft and a family of four inside the house were killed making the crash the deadliest accident involving the Beechcraft 1900.
 August 21, 1990: a Republic of China Air Force 1900C crashed in Yunlin County in central Taiwan, killing 18 officers on board.
 December 28, 1991: a Business Express Airlines 1900C crashed during a training flight when the instructor refused to take back the controls after the students became disoriented due to heavily stressing conditions imposed by the instructor, against the company's flight manual. This conclusion was controversial, as an investigation by the Airline Pilots Association showed that there were many indications of catastrophic airframe failure, not due to pilot error.
January 3, 1992: CommutAir Flight 4281 crashed in Gabriels, New York while on approach to Adirondack Regional Airport, killing the first officer and one passenger.
 December 7, 1995: an Air St. Martin 1900D drifted off course and crashed into a mountain in Haiti, killing all 20 people on board.
 November 19, 1996: a United Express 1900C collided on a runway with a Beechcraft King Air at Quincy Regional Airport in Illinois, killing all 14 people on board both aircraft.
 July 30, 1998: Proteus Airlines Flight 706, a 1900D, collided in midair with a Cessna 177RG over Quiberon Bay in France. None of the 14 passengers and crew survived.
 January 8, 2003: Air Midwest Flight 5481, a 1900D, crashed into a hangar just after takeoff from Charlotte/Douglas International Airport in North Carolina, killing all 21 people on board.
 August 26, 2003: Colgan Air Flight 9446, a 1900D operated for US Airways Express, hit the water shortly after taking off from Hyannis, Massachusetts. Both pilots died.
March 16, 2004: A 1900C operating for the United States Air Force  on approach to the Tonopah Test Range Airport in Nevada, killing all five people on board.
 May 2, 2008: a South Sudan Air Connection 1900 leased from CemAir crashed, killing 22 people including South Sudan's Minister of Defense.
 November 9, 2009: a 1900D of Bluebird Aviation crashed during a single-engine landing at Wilson Airport in Nairobi, Kenya, killing the captain and seriously injuring the first officer.
 November 5, 2010: JS Air Flight 201, a 1900C flying for JS Air (Private) Limited, experienced engine failure and crashed shortly after takeoff from Jinnah International Airport, Karachi, killing all 21 on board including both crew members.
 September 25, 2011: a Buddha Air 1900D crashed in Nepal during a return scenic flight from the Himalayas killing 19 on board including 3 crew.
 April 7, 2013: a 1900C disappeared with one occupant on board, the missionary Jerry Krause.
February 11, 2015: A Panamericano 1900C experienced an engine failure after takeoff from Miami Executive Airport and crashed while attempting to make an emergency landing, killing all four people on board.
 February 9, 2016: a Myanmar Air Force 1900D crashed shortly after taking off from Naypyidaw Airport killing 5 officers on board.
June 10, 2021: a Myanmar Air Force 1900D crashed on approach to Anisakan Airport, killing 12 of the 16 people on board.

Specifications (Beechcraft 1900D)

See also

Notes

References

References
 
 
 .
 
 
 Phillips, Edward H. Beechcraft – Pursuit of Perfection, A History of Beechcraft Airplanes. Flying Books, Eagan, Minnesota 1992.

External links
 
 Beechcraft 1900 specifications
 Airliners.net's background of the 1900
 Aviation Safety Network Beechcraft 1900 data
 Aviation Safety Network 1900 emergency exits
 Airsafe's List of fatal accidents involving the Beechcraft 1900
 Federation of American Scientists' description of the military C-12
 GlobalSecurity.org's background on the C-12J
 Army C-12 and Be-1900D Aircraft

1900
1980s United States airliners
Low-wing aircraft
T-tail aircraft
Aircraft first flown in 1982
Twin-turboprop tractor aircraft